Urotrygon aspidura, also known as the spiny-tail round ray or Panamic stingray, is a species of stingray native to the eastern-central and south-eastern Pacific, southern Baja, and the Gulf of California. It can grow up to 42 cm. They are severely threatened by shrimp fisheries.

References

aspidura
Fish described in 1882